St. Paul's Episcopal Church is a historic Episcopal church at Safford and 3rd Streets in Tombstone, Arizona, United States. Built in 1882, it is the oldest Protestant church in Arizona. It is part of the Episcopal Diocese of Arizona.

The Gothic Revival style church was built in 1882. It has a bell tower which, in 1971, had been recently constructed.

The church is relatively small  in plan, and cost $5,000 to build.

It was included as a contributing building in the Tombstone Historic District.

The building was added to the National Register of Historic Places in 1971.

See also
 National Register of Historic Places listings in Cochise County, Arizona

References

External links
 Official website
 

19th-century Episcopal church buildings
Episcopal church buildings in Arizona
Churches completed in 1882
Churches on the National Register of Historic Places in Arizona
Buildings and structures in Cochise County, Arizona
Gothic Revival church buildings in Arizona
1882 establishments in Arizona Territory
National Register of Historic Places in Cochise County, Arizona
Tombstone, Arizona